Lucas Daury (born 24 August 1995) is a French professional footballer who plays as a midfielder for Championnat National 2 club Les Herbiers.

Career
Daury is a youth product of Valenciennes. He made his Ligue 2 debut on 1 August 2014 against Gazélec Ajaccio in a 2–0 away defeat.

On 15 July 2020, it was confirmed that Duary had joined Gazélec Ajaccio on a one-year deal. In 2022, he signed for Les Herbiers.

References

1995 births
Living people
People from Harfleur
Association football midfielders
French footballers
Valenciennes FC players
US Boulogne players
CS Sedan Ardennes players
US Quevilly-Rouen Métropole players
Blois Football 41 players
Gazélec Ajaccio players
Vannes OC players
Les Herbiers VF players
Ligue 2 players
Championnat National players
Championnat National 2 players
Championnat National 3 players
Sportspeople from Seine-Maritime
Footballers from Normandy